The 1966 European Indoor Games were the first edition of what later became the European Athletics Indoor Championships. These games took place on 27 March 1966 at Westfalenhalle, Dortmund, a city of West Germany. It was the only edition held on a single day – since 1967 the duration was extended to two days and since 1992 to three.

The track used for the championships was 160 metres long.

Medal summary

Men

Women

Medal table

Participating nations

 (1)
 (13)
 (19)
 (3)
 (8)
 (11)
 (8)
 (2)
 (8)
 (1)
 (2)
 (12)
 (2)
 (4)
 (3)
 (13)
 (6)
 (8)
 (9)
 (2)
 (40)
 (11)

References
 1966 European Indoor Games Results
 Medallists – men at GBRathletics.com
 Medallists – women at GBRathletics.com

 
Athletics European Indoor
European Athletics Indoor Championships
European Indoor Games
Sports competitions in Dortmund
International athletics competitions hosted by West Germany
1966 in European sport
March 1966 sports events in Europe
1960s in North Rhine-Westphalia
20th century in Dortmund